HD 63765 is an 8th-magnitude G-type main sequence star located approximately 106 light years away in the constellation Carina. This star is smaller, cooler, dimmer, and less massive than the Sun, and has a lower iron content with approximately 69% of the Sun's iron-to-hydrogen ratio. In 2009, a gas giant planet was found in orbit around the star.

The star HD 63765 is named Tapecue. The name was selected by Bolivia during the 100th anniversary of the IAU as part of the IAU's NameExoWorlds project. Tapecue (modern Tapekue), literally 'eternal path' in Guarani, is the Milky Way through which the first inhabitants of the Earth arrived and could return. The planet HD 63765 b is named Yvaga. Yvága means 'sky' or 'heaven' in Guarani and the Milky Way was known as the road to yvága.

Planetary system

HD 63765 b is an extrasolar planet which orbits the star. This planet has at least 0.64 times the mass of Jupiter and takes 358 days to orbit the star at a semimajor axis of 0.94 AU. The planet was announced in a press release dating from October 2009.

See also 
 List of extrasolar planets

References 

G-type main-sequence stars
063765
038041
Carina (constellation)
Planetary systems with one confirmed planet
Durchmusterung objects